Coptodon kottae (formerly Tilapia kottae) is an endangered species of fish in the cichlid family, Cichlidae. It is endemic to Lake Barombi-ba-Kotto and the smaller nearby Lake Mboandong in the Southwest Region of Cameroon.

This is a substrate-brooding, benthopelagic fish. Its maximum length is about 15 centimeters.

Threats to the species include sedimentation, pollution, and deoxygenation of its native lakes caused by slash-and-burn agriculture and nearby oil plantations.

References

kottae
Endemic fauna of Cameroon
Taxonomy articles created by Polbot
Fish described in 1904